Men's long jump events for amputee athletes were held at the 2004 Summer Paralympics in the Athens Olympic Stadium. Events were held in three disability classes.

F42

The F42 event was won by Wojtek Czyz, representing .

27 Sept. 2004, 20:45

F44

The F44 event was won by Urs Kolly, representing .

25 Sept. 2004, 21:15

F46

The F46 event was won by Anton Skachkov, representing .

22 Sept. 2004, 19:00

References

M